Capo Murro di Porco Lighthouse is an active lighthouse located at the end of the  on the south eastern tip of Sicily in the , municipality of Siracusa on the Ionian Sea.

Description
No longer inhabited by the keeper's the building is the office of the "Consorzio dell'Area Marina Protetta del Plemmirio". The tower and the lantern are white; the lantern dome is grey metallic. The lighthouse is completely automated and managed by the Marina Militare with the identification code number 2910 E.F.

In December 2020, a photo taken by photographer Kevin Saragozza of the Jupiter-Saturn conjunction in the background of the lighthouse, was chosen as the "Photo of the Day" by NASA for the Astronomy Picture of the Day.

See also
 List of lighthouses in Italy

References

External links

 Servizio Fari Marina Militare

Lighthouses in Italy
Buildings and structures in Sicily